Jardel Pereira de Souza (born 27 January 1983), or simply Jardel, is a Brazilian footballer who plays for Esporte Clube Santo André as a central midfielder.

Club career
Jardel started his professional career at Cruzeiro Esporte Clube in 1999 at the age of 16, and made his Série A debut against Botafogo de Futebol e Regatas. He also helped the team win the 2003 Brazilian Cup, against Clube de Regatas do Flamengo.

In 2005 Jardel was loaned to Esporte Clube Juventude, being released by Cruzeiro shortly after. He then moved to Portugal, first appearing for C.S. Marítimo (only seven top division games and just four with the reserves, during nearly two full seasons). After an unassuming spell in his country with former team Cruzeiro, he returned to Portugal and played for C.F. Estrela da Amadora, C.D. Feirense and F.C. Penafiel, the first in the top division (scoring four goals in an eventual relegation due to irregularities).

Jardel returned to his country on 9 February 2011, moving to Associação Atlética Caldense. On 16 May, Série B side Ituiutaba Esporte Clube signed him for one season.

International career
Jardel was part of the Brazilian under-20 team that won the 2003 FIFA World Youth Championship in the United Arab Emirates. He appeared in four games during the tournament, including the 1–0 final win against Spain (90 minutes played).

Honours

Club
Cruzeiro
Brazilian League: 2003
Brazilian Cup: 2003
Minas Gerais State League: 2003, 2004, 2008

Country
FIFA U-20 World Cup: 2003

References

External links
Jardel at CBF  

Jardel at Soccer Terminal  

1983 births
Living people
Brazilian footballers
Brazil under-20 international footballers
Association football midfielders
Rio Branco Esporte Clube players
Cruzeiro Esporte Clube players
Esporte Clube Juventude players
Ceará Sporting Club players
Primeira Liga players
C.S. Marítimo players
C.F. Estrela da Amadora players
C.D. Feirense players
F.C. Penafiel players
Esporte Clube Santo André players
Brazilian expatriate footballers
Expatriate footballers in Portugal
Pan American Games medalists in football
Pan American Games silver medalists for Brazil
Footballers at the 2003 Pan American Games
Medalists at the 2003 Pan American Games
Sportspeople from Tocantins